Waubonsie (or Wabaunsee or Waubonsee or Waubansee) was a Potawatomi leader.

These names may also refer to:

Wabaunsee, Kansas
Waubonsie State Park, Iowa
Wabaunsee County, Kansas
Wabaunsee Township, Kansas
Wabaunsee Creek, Kansas
Lake Wabaunsee, Kansas
Waubonsie Valley High School, Aurora, Illinois
Waubonsee Community College, Sugar Grove, Illinois
USS Waubansee (YTM-366), a United States Navy harbor tug placed in service in 1944 and stricken in 1983